City Stadium SRC Slavija (″SRC″ stands for ), is a multi-purpose stadium in Istočno Sarajevo, Republika Srpska, Bosnia and Herzegovina. It is currently used mostly for football matches and is the home ground of FK Slavija Sarajevo. The stadium has a capacity that can hold 6,000 people.

References

FK Slavija Sarajevo
Football venues in Bosnia and Herzegovina
Istočno Sarajevo
Multi-purpose stadiums in Bosnia and Herzegovina
Buildings and structures in Republika Srpska